Gonaté is a town in west-central Ivory Coast. It is a sub-prefecture of Daloa Department in Haut-Sassandra Region, Sassandra-Marahoué District.

Gonaté was a commune until March 2012, when it became one of 1126 communes nationwide that were abolished.

In 2021, the population of the sub-prefecture of Gonaté was 44,611.

Villages
The 6 villages of the sub-prefecture of Gonaté and their population in 2014 are:
 Bégafla (3 657)
 Gonaté (19 161)
 Gonaté Kouamekro (2 420)
 Séifla (4 650)
 Sétréfla (4 353)
 Zéréfla (2 697)

Notes

Sub-prefectures of Haut-Sassandra
Former communes of Ivory Coast